Zodac is a fictional character, a cosmic superheroic entity in the Masters of the Universe mythology. The spelling varies between Zodac and Zodak in different sources (until the two were later defined as separate characters). In a unique curiosity of the Masters of the Universe franchise, portrayals of Zodac vary considerably from medium to medium since the franchise began in the 1980s, leaving many confused over the character. The fact that in the original line and accompanying animated series's run, the character was very seldom used, added to the mystery surrounding him even further.

The general representation of Zodac is that he is a neutral character, a cosmic enforcer who participates little in conflict but can aid either the heroic or evil sides in their hour of need. However, the original 8-back release of the figure has his title as "Cosmic Enforcer", and in later re-release it was changed to "Evil Cosmic Enforcer", and this representation filtered through to a few other versions of the franchise. The design and character of Zodac is heavily influenced by the New God, Metron, created by Jack Kirby for his Fourth World comic series.

Fictional character biography

Pre-cartoon era
Zodac was one of the first characters to be conceived by Mattel in the development of the Masters of the Universe toy line, and was released in 1982. Created by Mark Taylor. Mattel's original idea was to have two female action figures Sorceress and Teela. But a later change had Mattel only release one figure Teela, with the ability to change her armor on and off to be used as different characters. So Zodac was last-minute addition.

Original B-sheet design by Mark Taylor describes Zodac (with early name Sensor):

"Sensor: Man of the Future. Scientifically heightened senses, knowledge & weapons. Acts in support roll [sic] to He-Man and as a foil to Tee la's mystic nature."

His action figure is tagged as a 'Cosmic Enforcer' and his action figure, despite being generally human in appearance, was given claw-like feet and hands, a standard trait of the line's evil characters. Original 8-back packaging also describes him as "Cosmic Encorcer" which appears in promotional toy-adverts and mini-comic crossell inner art. The character was originally to be named Sensor, and was always intended to have the "evil" limbs.

Early Mattel 1981 Licensing Kit has Zodac described as "The Cosmic Enforcer. The bounty hunter of our exciting universe." Many characters don't have a clear good/evil connotation, though same Licensing Kit described Stratos as "a villain soaring on the Wings of Wickedness."

Later when Zodac was re-released in the vintage line, his title was changed as "Evil Cosmic Enforcer", putting him in the villain side and thus balancing out the character numbers of heroes and villains. He does not appear in any of the toys' accompanying minicomics, leaving many kids unsure of the exact nature of his character or what role he was supposed to play in the story. The description on the back of his toy card read "Zodac attacks the Heroic Warriors with all the evil power at his command", an ambiguous description, which one can interpret as signifying either a generic Evil Warrior, or a universal enforcer of evil who somehow epitomized all evil power.

The mystery surrounding Zodac is heavily exacerbated by his use in the DC Comics, which features him acting as a neutral character who seemingly oversees the whole conflict and serves to maintain balance between the two sides of good and evil, ensuring when he can, that both sides get their way, and helping either side when they need it. As a watcher of the universe, he naturally knows that Prince Adam is He-Man. Although he does not appear in any of the regular minicomics, he appears in the book and record that comes with the Point Dread & Talon Fighter playset, which also presents him in such a neutral role. However, as this playset was less commonly owned than the standard figures, many fans never saw this appearance and thus were still confused.

It is often believed that this "neutral" role was Mattel's original concept behind Zodac, and the labelling of him as 'Evil' was done purely to even out the evil figures against the heroic, or that he was classed as an Evil Warrior simply because the 'Heroic' and 'Evil' groupings on the boxes did not have a 'Neutral' category, but Mattel has never confirmed this.

Filmation era
In He-Man and the Masters of the Universe by Filmation, Zodac appears in three episodes of the show's first season: "Quest for He-Man", "The Search" and "Golden Disks of Knowledge". The show's portrayal of the character is generally in keeping with that of the DC Comics, although it is clear in the cartoon that he leans more towards the side of good and serves essentially to help maintain peace within the universe. As the cartoon never shows him acting on the side of evil, and he never shares any scenes with Skeletor, many viewers of the show perceive him as one of the good guys, even though this is not entirely true. It is his portrayal on the cartoon that heightened the confusion over the character, as viewers of the show who saw him as a good guy were perplexed when they went out to buy his figure.

In the cartoon he is presented as an all-powerful character who sees and understands all. The most important of his three episodes is "The Search", in which he sends He-Man out on a quest to prevent Skeletor from reaching the Star Seed, a powerful object that will give him control over the whole universe. A twist ending reveals that Zodac set up the whole affair, telling Skeletor of the Star Seed and sending He-Man to defend it, in a test of He-Man's ability to resist the temptation of using the Star Seed's power for himself.

The episode "Golden Disks of Knowledge", meanwhile, reveals that Zodac is the last remaining member of the Council of the Wise, often referred to as "The Council of Elders", a universal council of knowledge and wisdom keepers. It is revealed that Skeletor achieved most of his power after he stole the Golden Disks from the Council of the Wise after corrupting another of its members, Zanthor, into selling them to him. The end of the episode features the reformed Zanthor donning a uniform like Zodac's and leaving for the stars together with him to watch over the universe.

The series bible delves more into the history of Zodac, telling us that not only was Zodac a member of the Council of Elders, he was also the leader, and the only member to retain his human form after the Council became the spirit of Grayskull. He then vowed to sail the universe, keeping watch over Eternia but not interfering in the natural course of events.

In the 1980s cartoon, Zodac hosted the closing moral/PSA segment for two of the episodes he appears in: "Quest for He-Man" and "The Search". Being a duty widely considered suitable only for the "good" characters, this reinforces the notion of Zodac's default alignment being benevolent.

Other media
Other media to produce Masters of the Universe stories throughout the 1980s took radically differing approaches to the character of Zodac. Some storybooks, most notably the UK Ladybird Books, portray him as a wholly evil character in servitude to Skeletor. In this storybook series he is portrayed as just another of Skeletor's bumbling henchmen, the complete opposite of the noble deity-like figure of the cartoon series.

Several other books and comic series portray him as a fully heroic character, while others are more in-keeping with the DC Comics and Filmation's portrayals.

2002 series
When Zodak featured in the 2002 relaunch of the Masters of the Universe franchise, Masters of the Universe vs. The Snake Men, complexities arose in updating the character for a modern audience. Indeed, toy sculptors the Four Horsemen originally planned a radical change for the character by making him a strange alien creature rather than a human, in an apparent effort to enhance the view of him as a universal watcher. However, when Mattel demanded racial diversity in the toy line, the Four Horsemen looked to change skin colours and, after firstly considering Stratos, but deciding that Stratos' overall design did not go well with the racial change, Zodak was chosen. Just as in the original line, the Zodak figure appears as a brown or bronze-skinned character and slightly darker than the action figure; for the new toyline, tribal markings were added to his arms and forehead.

As Ian Richter of Mattel worked on developments for the cartoon's storyline with Mike Young Productions, it was decided to link Zodak to the planned story line for season 2, dealing with the resurrection of the Snake Men. Although Zodak had no connection with the Snake Men in the old continuity, in the new series his whole role in the show revolves around them.

Zodak appears in this series as an all-powerful and immortal warrior from Ancient times, presumably the most powerful warrior on Eternia in the present time. Having aided the Elders in the defeat of the Snake Men centuries ago, Zodak is called upon in the episode "Snake Pit" to help prevent the Snake Men from being released from their ancient prison. It is revealed in this episode that Zodak harbors a centuries-old grudge against the Snake Men after King Hiss ate his brother, Zeelahr. Presumably it was his brother's murder that convinced Zodak to give up his mortality.

Zodak resides in a small wooden temple in the Mystic Mountains, where he spends most of his time in deep meditation. He refuses to let his grudge against the Snake Men die and will do everything he can until King Hiss has perished. Although this inevitably involves him aiding He-Man and the Masters from time to time, he has pledged no alliance and refuses to officially side with anyone in the battle, abiding purely by his own sense of right and wrong with little consideration for others. In season 2 it is Zodak who allows the Snake Men to be freed, placing Eternia in danger, for the sake of achieving his own revenge, which leads to a conflict between him and He-Man in the "Rise of the Snake Men" 2-parter. Zodak returns in the final episode of the series, "Awaken the Serpent", in which he finally defeats King Hiss. During this episode Zodak finds an unconscious Prince Adam and upon awakening him Zodak hands Prince Adam the Power Sword stating, "He-Man is needed." Prince Adam proceeds to turn into He-Man but right before holding aloft the Power Sword asks Zodak, "Could you at least turn your back?" The whole series ends with a shot of Zodak flying off into the sky in his chair, as He-Man thanks him for winning the conflict against the Snake Men.

Masters of the universe classics era 
Also to note is the exact spelling - in the later Masters of the Universe Classics line, Zodac and Zodak would become two different characters, while in the original line both spellings were used for the same character. The front of the box spelled the name 'Zodac' and backside, while some mini-comics listings later for the figure spelled it 'Zodak'.

The 2009 Zodac action figure establishes that his real name in this canon is  Zodac Zur.

The 2009 Zodak action figure establishes that his real name is Kar-Tor, and that he is the apprentice of the original Zodac. In 2002-era he didn't have "real name".

Live action He-Man movie
Zodac will appear in the live action He-Man movie. In the film, Zodak is King Randor's Minister of Technology and his right hand man.

Reception
Comic Book Resources listed the character as part of He-Man: 15 Most Powerful Masters of the Universe.

References

Extraterrestrial superheroes
Fictional characters introduced in 1981
Fictional extraterrestrial characters
Masters of the Universe Evil Warriors
Masters of the Universe Heroic Warriors
Male characters in animated series